The siege of Hama (2011) was among the nationwide crackdowns by the Syrian Government during the early stage of the Syrian civil war. Anti-government protests had been ongoing in the Syrian city of Hama since 15 March 2011, when large protests were first reported in the city, similar to the protests elsewhere in Syria as part of the wider Syrian civil war. The events beginning in July 2011, were described by anti-government activists in the city as a "siege" or "blockade".

On 1 July, with more than 400,000 protestors, Hama witnessed the largest demonstration against Bashar al-Assad. Two days later, Syrian tanks deployed at Hama, in an operation that led to more than 16 civilian deaths at the hands of Syrian security forces.

On 31 July, the Government of Syria sent the Syrian Army into Hama to control protests on the eve of Ramadan, as part of a nationwide crackdown, nicknamed the "Ramadan Massacre." At least 142 people across Syria died on that day, including over 100 in Hama alone, and 29 in Deir ez-Zor. Hundreds more have been wounded. By 4 August, more than 200 civilians had been killed in Hama.

Background

Early history

Hama has been the epicenter of Syrian civil war since the very event of the 1963 Ba'athist coup. As early as 1964, a wide scale riot, often described as uprising, broke out in the city, and was violently suppressed by the military, resulting in more than 70 citizens killed. Violence occurred once again during the 1976–1982 Islamic uprising in Syria, when hundreds of Hama citizens were executed in the April 1981 crackdown, whereas in February 1982, a much larger scale massacre took place in Hama, following an armed and organized uprising of Islamic groups, centered in the city. The 1982 Hama massacre claimed the lives of some 10,000 - 25,000 Hama citizens and Islamic militants and as many as 1,000 Syrian Army personnel.

Prelude
Major disturbances in Hama began on 3 June 2011, primarily in the city center, and on occasion in the suburbs. The Syrian security forces shot dead up to 25 people when they dispersed a demonstration by tens of thousands of locals in the city of Hama on Friday 3 June 2011.

On 1 July 2011, with more than 400,000 protestors, Hama witnessed the largest demonstration against Bashar al-Assad. Soon after, Assad sacked Hama's governor. Two days after, Syrian tanks deployed at Hama, in an operation that led to more than 20 civilians killed by the Syrian security forces and two rape cases were witnessed.

Chronology

July 2011

As the city of Hama became one of the main opposition centers of the popular uprising taking place in Syria, Hama turned into a focal point of growing violence. An armed blockade was imposed on the city on 3 July.

On 6 July, the US ambassador Robert Ford visited Hama and declared that he would stay until Friday, to the ire of the Syrian government. On 8 July, more than 500,000 Syrians flooded through the city of Hama in what activists claim was the single biggest protest yet against the embattled government of President Bashar al-Assad.

JJ Harder, the press attaché of the US embassy in Damascus, later told Al Jazeera: "Our ambassador Robert Ford was in Hama earlier this month, and he saw with his own eyes the violence that they are talking about. There was none. He maybe saw one teenager with a stick at a checkpoint, and the government is going on with these absolute fabrications about armed gangs running the streets of Hama and elsewhere. Hama has shown itself to be a model of peaceful protest. That was why our ambassador chose to go there."

The French ambassador joined the U.S. ambassador to express his support to the victims.

On 7 July, French and American ambassadors to Syria toured some of the nation’s conflict zones. The American ambassador Robert Ford, along with the French ambassador Éric Chevallier, traveled to the city of Hama in what Robert Ford claimed to be "a gesture of solidarity with local protesters".

On 8 July, more tanks were deployed around the outskirts of Hama as part of a strengthening blockade, following protests involving an estimated 500,000 people the previous weekend. It is estimated that up to 350,000 of the city's 700,000 population took part in the protests

Over 500,000 citizens had rallied in the city on 29 July, following Muslim prayers in which a pro-rebel cleric told the congregation "the regime must go". Local support for the government had imploded by 30 July in both Homs, Deir ez-Zor and Hama. President Assad sent his "Terror Buses" packed with private Alawite militia and party loyalists into Hama on 30 July.

On the eve of Ramadan, Syria witnessed the bloodiest day in the 139-day uprising against the single-party government.

Abdel Rahman of the Britain-based Syrian Observatory For Human Rights said on 31 July that Syrian security forces launched an offensive at 5:00 am (0200 GMT) on Muadhamiya, to the north, then encircled Hama shortly afterwards.

In a separate incident on the same day, political prisoners attempted to mutiny in Hama's central prison, to which security forces responded with live ammunition. The death toll in the prison is unknown. The state news agency reported that eight policemen were killed in clashes in Hama.

The government has blamed much of the violence on terrorists and militants, who it says have killed hundreds of security personnel. At least 136 fatalities were confirmed, with over 100 in Hama and 19 in Deir ez-Zor, in addition to hundreds of injuries. The crackdown was the most intense of the Syrian civil war thus far, with over 2,200 protesters dead.

One Hama resident, a doctor who did not want to be identified for fear of arrest, told Reuters that tanks were attacking Hama from four different directions and "firing randomly". Another resident said snipers had climbed onto the roofs of the state-owned electricity company and the main prison, and that electricity had been cut in eastern neighbourhoods. Syrian government tanks also fired on mosques where the loudspeakers broadcast, "Allahu Akbar".

The Security Council met on the night of 31 July to debate the situation in Syria.

Syrian dissidents claimed that the tank assault on Hama on 31 July, in which 84 people had died, was an attempt to pacify and regain control of the city ahead of Ramadan and to avert protests during the holy month.

August 2011
Syrian security forces continued to bombard Hama on 1 August. The British Daily Telegraph reported that "many of Hama's residents . . . braved the obvious danger to head to mosques for dawn prayers. As they emerged onto the streets, the shelling resumed. Three worshipers were struck down and killed, while a fourth was shot dead by a sniper as he got into his car, opposition activists said. . . . Tank shells struck residential buildings in the suburbs of al-Qousour and Al-Hamidiya." According to one resident, "The tanks are firing at random. They don't care who they hit. The aim seems to be to kill and terrify as many people as possible."' "The number of those wounded is huge and hospitals cannot cope, particularly because we lack the adequate equipment," said Hama hospital worker, Dr Abdel Rahman. "It seems strange that the international community seems to care less about the people of Hama than the people of Benghazi," said Omar, a rebel activist in Damascus. The death toll in Hama and Homs was reportedly 'slightly enlarged' according to the local governorate's sources. Government tanks also moved in on the eastern town of Albu Kamal. In the nearby city of Deir al-Zour, had witnessed upwards to 29 over that weekend.

Activists and witnesses said at least 24 civilians were killed in attacks on several cities, including Hama, on 1 August. Later that day, The European Union imposed travel bans on five more military and government officials and extended sanctions against Assad's government, including Syrian Defence Minister Ali Habib Mahmud.

The UN's security council met to discuss the situation in Syria on 2 August. The US, UK and France wanted to formally condemn Syria, but Russia and China were afraid that "it could be used as a pretext for military intervention in Syria".

On 2 August, Syrian dissident Radwan Ziadeh asked US President Barack Obama and US Secretary of State Hillary Clinton to demand President Bashar al-Assad to step down.

By the morning of 3 August 2011, the city was under nearly continuous gunfire since the early hours of the morning and by midday Syrian army tanks stormed through rebel’s barricades in city of Hama, occupying a central square. A post on the Syrian Revolution Facebook page read "The army is now stationed in Assi Square," and "The heroic youths of Hama are confronting them and banning them from entering neighborhoods."
The water, electricity and all communications in Hama and its surrounding villages and towns had been cut off, according to nearby online posts on social networking sites.
The accounts could not be independently confirmed because the Syrian government banned foreign journalists from entering the country to report. Shaam, an online video channel that is aligned to the protest movement, posted a video dated 3 August that showed at least one tank attacking a neighbourhood that the narrator said was Hayy al-Hader in Hama; heavy plumes of smoke could be seen rising in the sky.

On 3 August, following the attacks, workers in Hama declared three days of general strike in memory of those killed by security forces.

The town’s pro-democracy movement, the Local Coordination Committee, had emailed a statement saying that shelling was especially concentrated in the Janoub al-Mala’ab and Manakh districts. The group also claimed in the E-mail that civilians were being shot and houses shelled. Rami Abdel Rahman, head of the Syrian Observatory For Human Rights, warned that "We might be witnessing another massacre in Hama."

Russia’s Foreign Ministry's Middle East and North Africa Department chief, Sergei Vershinin, reminded the UN that his country was not "categorically" against adopting a UN resolution condemning the violence in Syria, but the Syrian Deputy Foreign Minister, Faisal Mekdad urged India to ignore Western "propaganda" if there was a vote over it in the Security Council.

A total of 200 were killed in Hama by 4 August.

Aftermath

The Attorney General of the Hama Governorate announced his resignation on 1 September in response to the government crackdown on protests. The government claimed he had been kidnapped and forced to lie at gunpoint.

On 28 February 2012, government forces shelled a town in Hama Province, Helfaya, killing 20 civilian villagers. Activists said the 20 deaths of Sunni Muslim villagers there were among at least 100 killed in the province in the last two weeks in revenge for rebel Free Syrian Army attacks on security forces commanded by members of Assad’s minority Alawite sect.

International reactions

Supranational organisations
  The Security Council passed a resolution that "condemns widespread violations of human rights and the use of force against civilians by the Syrian authorities." on 4 August.
  The European Union imposed travel bans on five more military and government officials and extended sanctions against Mr Assad's ruling clique on 1 August.

States
  -The chairman of the German government's committee on foreign relations declared that there should be a global boycott of Syrian gas and oil exports with the aim to pressure Syria into ending its violence against protesters. Meanwhile, on the same day (8 August), a German government spokesman declared that if Assad continues to reject dialogue and resort to violence, the Syrian government will lose its legitimacy.
  – Foreign Minister Franco Frattini called the events in Hama "a horrible act of violent repression against protesters."
  – Former Prime Minister and leader of the March 14 alliance Saad Hariri condemned what he called a "massacre" and the "bloody murders" that he said the Syrian people endure.
  - On 1 August, the Kremlin, which has been a Syrian ally, in the person of President Dmitri A. Medvedev strongly condemned the government's actions in Hama, calling them "unacceptable."
  - President Abdullah Gül expressed horror over Syrian security forces' use of heavy weapons, including tanks, to quell civilian protests. "It's impossible to remain silent in the face of events visible to everyone. I urge the Syrian administration to stop violence against people and to carry out reforms to build the country's future on the base of peace and stability. We cannot remain silent and accept a bloody atmosphere," Gül said.
  - A press release from the British Prime Minister’s office requested that President Bashar-al Assad 'should reform or step aside' on the noon of 1 August.
Foreign Secretary William Hague condemned the attack later that day, but said that any military action was not even "a remote possibility" and "There is no prospect of a legal, morally sanctioned military intervention".

  – President Barack Obama said the reports from Hama were horrifying and demonstrated the true character of the Syrian government. "Once again, President Assad has shown that he is completely incapable and unwilling to respond to the legitimate grievances of the Syrian people," he said. He said he was appalled by the government's use of "violence and brutality against its own people". President Obama also vowed to diplomatically isolate president Bashar al-Assad as various human rights groups said that Syrian forces killed nearly 140 people in Syria on 31 July, including 100 when the army stormed the flashpoint city of Hama.

See also
 1982 Hama Massacre
 2012 Hama massacre
 Siege of Aleppo (1980)

References

Hama Governorate in the Syrian civil war
History of Hama
Military operations of the Syrian civil war in 2011
Sieges of the Syrian civil war
Military operations of the Syrian civil war involving the Syrian government
July 2011 events in Syria
August 2011 events in Syria